The women's 10 metre platform, also reported as platform diving, was one of four diving events on the Diving at the 1980 Summer Olympics programme.

The competition was split into two phases:

Preliminary round (25 July)
Divers performed eight dives. The eight divers with the highest scores advanced to the final.
Final (26 July)
Divers performed another set of eight dives and the score here obtained was combined with half of the preliminary score to determine the final ranking.

Results

References

Sources
 

Women
1980
1980 in women's diving
Div

it:Tuffi ai Giochi della XXII Olimpiade - Piattaforma 10 metri maschile